Newee Creek is a locality on the North Coast of New South Wales, Australia. The North Coast railway line passes through, and a station existed at the site between 1923 and 1974.

References 

Mid North Coast
Towns in New South Wales